"Hebban olla vogala", sometimes spelled "hebban olla uogala", are the first three words of an 11th-century text fragment written in Old Dutch. The fragment, also known as the Rochester Poem, was discovered in 1932 on the flyleaf of a manuscript that was probably made in the abbey of Rochester, Kent, now Oxford, Bodleian Library, MS Bodley 340. The MS contains a collection of Old English sermons by Aelfric. The Dutch text is found on f. 169v and probably dates to the third quarter of the 11th century. It is usually considered to represent a West Flemish variant of Old Low Franconian.

An often cited poem, it was long believed by many Dutch-speaking people to be the only text remaining of Old Dutch. However, experts were already aware of other sources that were then not yet easily accessible. Today, more than 42,000 Old Dutch words and phrases from sources such as the Wachtendonck Psalms and the Leiden Willeram have been discovered, with the oldest definitive source being the Salian Law.

Text
The complete text, a probatio pennae or "scribble" by the writer to test their pen, is usually transcribed as Hebban olla uogala nestas hagunnan hinase hic enda thu uuat unbidan uue nu. This is a word-for-word translation of the Latin sentence written directly above it: . It is roughly translated as: "Have all birds begun nests, except me and you - what are we waiting for?"

Comparison to Modern Dutch and Modern English
In this comparison, similar Old English (West Saxon variety), Modern Dutch and Modern English words (in form and meaning) are chosen to compare them with the Old Dutch equivalents in the sentence. The Old English cognates are only given due to the proximity of the two languages (and for distinguishing the local language of where the document was found). The Dutch sentence is a correct one, although the verb 'begonnen' is usually conjugated with 'zijn' (be) and not with 'hebben' (have). For English the word order had to be adjusted. For 'hinase' and 'unbidan' there are no close matches in either language.

The form hinase corresponds morphologically to Modern Dutch tenzij ("unless", from het en zij) and does not seem to have a Modern English cognate.

Origin
The text is usually considered West Flemish; the arguments in favour of this view were advanced by Schönfeld (1933). According to his interpretation, *agunnan, hinase and (as he read it) anda are Ingvaeonic forms whose presence might be expected in any of the coastal dialects of Old Frisian, Old Saxon or Old Frankish. However, the -n of third person plural hebban, which is absent in both Old English and Frisian, identifies the language as Old Dutch. (Old High German habent uses a different stem.) nestas is the plural of a masculine nest that is attested in Middle Dutch and is still present in West Flemish. vogala has an epenthetic vocal of a type also found in certain Old Ghentish words, whereas Old English has fuglas. The form olla is the result of a vowel shift a > o before ll that is thought to have occurred in West Flemish at a very early date, possibly before 900. Finally,  and  have a prothetic h; according to Schönfeld, this also points to West Flemish, in which the h is frequently dropped or (in the written language) added before vowels (cf.  in the Latin version).

Various theories

The text has been proposed as Old English, more specifically the Old Kentish.

Frits van Oostrom has linked it to the Moorish Kharjas genre, which includes verses sung by women to their absent lovers. He concludes that the fragment was probably written by a woman or from a female perspective.

See also

 Gruuthuse manuscript
 History of Dutch

References

Low Franconian languages
Dutch literature
Old Dutch